Zdravko Hlebanja (15 October 1929 – 9 March 2018) was a Slovenian cross-country skier. He competed in the men's 15 kilometre event at the 1956 Winter Olympics.

References

1929 births
2018 deaths
Slovenian male cross-country skiers
Olympic cross-country skiers of Yugoslavia
Cross-country skiers at the 1956 Winter Olympics
People from Kranjska Gora